2 Corinthians 8 is the eighth chapter of the Second Epistle to the Corinthians in the New Testament of the Christian Bible. It is authored by Paul the Apostle and Timothy (2 Corinthians 1:1) in Macedonia in 55–56 CE. This chapter, and the next one, "are devoted entirely to the topic of generous giving".

Text
The original text was written in Koine Greek. This chapter is divided into 24 verses.

Textual witnesses
Some early manuscripts containing the text of this chapter are:
Papyrus 46 (~AD 200)
Codex Vaticanus (325–350)
Codex Sinaiticus (330–360)
Codex Alexandrinus (400–440)
Codex Ephraemi Rescriptus (~450)
Codex Freerianus (~450; extant verses 6–7,14–17,24)
Codex Claromontanus (~550)

Old Testament references
 :

Verse 9
 For you know the grace of our Lord Jesus Christ, that though He was rich, yet for your sakes He became poor, that you through His poverty might become rich.
"Though He was rich, yet for your sakes He became poor": From having the fullness of the Godhead in Him, for the sake of human being, Jesus had become human and was exposed to outward poverty, born of poor parents, had no place to lay His head, was ministered to by others, had nothing to bequeath His mother at His death, but had to commit her to the care of one of His disciples; fulfilled the prophecies of Him, that He should be "poor" and "low" (Zechariah 9:9).

Verse 18 
 And we have sent with him the brother, whose praise is in the gospel throughout all the churches.
For many church fathers, such as Pseudo-Ignatius (250 AD), John Chrysostom (407 AD), Jerome (420 AD)  Pelagius (420 AD), Oecumenius (990 AD), this Pauline verse written in 55 AD refers to Luke and his gospel.

Lukan authorship of a New Testament Gospel is dead in the water, as far as mainstream Bible scholars are concerned.

Collection for the Judean Saints
"Next to his ministry of preaching to the Gentiles, Paul's most important activity during his ministry was to collect money for the poor [believers] in Jerusalem." Paul confirms in  that this was a part of his ministry which he considered important and endorsed by the leaders of the church in Jerusalem.

See also
Macedonia
Titus
Related Bible parts: Luke 12, 2 Corinthians 9, Ephesians 1, Philippians 4, Hebrews 11, Revelation 3

References

Sources

External links
 King James Bible - Wikisource
English Translation with Parallel Latin Vulgate
Online Bible at GospelHall.org (ESV, KJV, Darby, American Standard Version, Bible in Basic English)
Multiple bible versions at Bible Gateway (NKJV, NIV, NRSV etc.)

2 Corinthians 8